In 2012, UTA Brand Studio was unveiled as the brand strategy division of United Talent Agency (UTA), one of the world's largest literary and talent agencies. The studio is based in UTA's Beverly Hills, CA headquarters.

Laurence Vincent and Michellene DeBonis are UTA Brand Studio co-founders. Vincent's 20-year career in branding has included roles with Siegel + Gale and Octagon, Inc., for such clients as Disney, MasterCard, Microsoft, the NFL, PlayStation and Qualcomm. DeBonis also brings 20 years of brand experience including work for Bare Minerals, Panasonic, Microsoft, Yahoo!, Operation Smile and Susan G. Komen. Other UTA Brand Studio team members include Creative Director R. Marcus Bartlett—who joined the team from Futurebrand where he won a Clio Award for his work with American Airlines—and Director of Client Engagement Catherine Davie.

Vincent has written two brand strategy books. In March 2012, Brand Real was released, focusing on the strategic behavior that drives the success of the world's leading brands. Brand Real was recognized by strategy+business magazine as one of the best business books of 2012. In 2001, Legendary Brands was released, examining the storytelling potential of brands and implications for strategic and creative development.

Brand Attachment Research
In January 2014, a new quantitative research tool measuring brand attachment was launched by UTA Brand Studio. Brand Dependence™ is described as a tool to measure the personal connection consumers have to a brand and the degree to which they see a brand as being part of who they are. Developed in an exclusive partnership with uSamp and UTA Brand Studio, Brand Dependence™ is built upon the pioneering academic research on brand attachment of Deborah MacInnis, Vice Dean and Professor at USC Marshall School of Business and C. Whan Park Professor of Marketing at USC Marshall School of Business.

At CES 2014, the UTA Brand Studio announced the inaugural Brand Dependence™ index focusing on technology brands. Social media brands were examined in the second installment.

Some of UTA Brand Studio's clients include The Elizabeth Taylor Trust, Bare Minerals, Mattel and the Consumer Electronics Association. In 2014, the studio was named a winner of the CLIO Image Awards Shortlist in the Design category on behalf of client The Elizabeth Taylor Trust.

Some of the media outlets that have featured Larry Vincent include Forbes, Digiday and Ragan.com. Vincent has presented to such groups as CES, SXSW, The Conference Board, CMO Collective, and Digital Hollywood, among others. In April 2014, UTA Brand Studio in conjunction with Live Talks LA hosted Twitter co-founder and Jelly CEO Biz Stone in conversation with Vincent about Stone's new book THINGS A LITTLE BIRD TOLD ME: CONF Mark.

References

External links
 UTA Brand Studio

Talent and literary agencies
Privately held companies based in California
American companies established in 2012
Companies based in Beverly Hills, California